MV Golden Mariana is a passenger ferry operated by Orkney Ferries.

History
MV Golden Mariana was built in 1973 by Bideford Shipyard in Bideford, UK. She was designed by John England of Padstow, Cornwall. The designer and builder of the Padstow speedboats. She was originally a pleasure boat which took passengers on short cruises around the Camel estuary and surrounding coastline during the summer. She was designed to be a dual purpose vessel that could easily convert to a fishing trawler for the winter when tourists were few and far between. She was launched by David England in 1973. He was six years old at the time and still wearing pyjamas on the day he was released from hospital after having his tonsils removed. She had a proper launch, smashing a bottle of champagne across her bow as she was blessed.

Service
MV Golden Mariana is normally allocated to the Westray to Papa Westray service.

References

1973 ships
Transport in Orkney
Ferries of Scotland
Ships built in Devon